
Year 791 (DCCXCI) was a common year starting on Saturday (link will display the full calendar) of the Julian calendar. The denomination 791 for this year has been used since the early medieval period, when the Anno Domini calendar era became the prevalent method in Europe for naming years.

Events 
 By place 
 Europe 
 The Avars, a pagan Asian nomadic horde that has settled down in what is today Hungary, invade Friuli and Bavaria. King Charlemagne assembles a Frankish army, and marches down the Danube River to ravage Avar territory. A Frankish-Lombard expeditionary force, under his son Pepin, (king of the Lombards) invades the Drava Valley and devastates Pannonia.
 Summer – Charlemagne loses most of his riding and baggage horses during an equine epidemic; many Saxons take advantage of Charlemagne's Avar setback and rebel once more.
 September 14 – Alfonso II, the son of former king Fruela I, becomes ruler of Asturias (Northern Spain). He moves the capital to Oviedo, the commercial centre of the region.

 Britain 
 Princes Ælf and Ælfwine of Northumbria, the sons of former king Ælfwald I, are persuaded to leave their sanctuary in York Minster, and are immediately forcibly drowned in Wonwaldremere, at the instigation of King Æthelred I.

 Africa 
 Emir Idris I, founder of the Idrisid Dynasty and kingdom of Morocco, is poisoned on orders of Caliph Harun al-Rashid. He is succeeded by his son Idris II (only just two months old), who is raised by his mother Kenza among the Berbers of Volubilis.

Births 
 Idris II, Muslim emir of Morocco (d. 828)
 Pei Xiu, chancellor of the Tang Dynasty (d. 864)

Deaths 
 Artgal mac Cathail, king of Connacht (Ireland) 
 Idris I, emir and founder of the Idrisid Dynasty (b. 745)
 Wermad, bishop of Trier
 Zhang Xiaozhong, general of the Tang Dynasty (b. 730)

References